Playa de la Barrosa is a  long beach in the municipality of Chiclana de la Frontera, Province of Cádiz, Spain. It was the site of the Battle of Barrosa in 1811. It is separated from the Playa de Sancti Petri by a cliff. The resort of Novo Sancti Petri lies at the south end of Playa de la Barrosa and contains a defensive tower structure called Torre Bermeja. Several pieces of music have been composed about the beach including Isaac Albéniz's Torre Bermeja and Paco de Lucía's La Barrosa.

History
The Battle of Chiclana and La Barrosa is said to have occurred on the Playa de la Barrosa, marking an important milestone in the Spanish War of Independence.

References

External links

Beaches of Andalusia
Chiclana de la Frontera
Geography of the Province of Cádiz
Tourist attractions in Andalusia